Robert Felton (born September 25, 1984 in Houston, Texas) is a former American football guard. He was signed by the Buffalo Bills as an undrafted free agent in 2008.

He played  college football for the Arkansas Razorbacks. Felton started 42 games while he played for the Razorbacks. Felton also was awarded 1st team All-SEC honors 2007, 2nd Team AP All-American Honors 2007, and is a member of the Arkansas Razorback All-Decade Team 2010.

Felton has degrees in sociology and criminal justice.

Felton has also been a member of the Oakland Raiders.

Recently Robert Felton has been featured on an ESPN Radio Show in Fayetteville, Ar where he still lives

References

Further reading
 Robert Felton at Sports Illustrated

External links
Arkansas Razorbacks bio
 Robert Felton at CBSSports.com
 Robert Felton at Arkansas Football
 Robert Felton at Scout.com

1984 births
Living people
People from Houston
American football offensive guards
Arkansas Razorbacks football players
Buffalo Bills players
Oakland Raiders players